The Galveston Pirates were a Texas League baseball team based in Galveston, Texas, United States that existed from 1912 to 1917 and from 1919 to 1921.

Galveston was minor league baseball home to the Galveston White Caps (1950–1955), Galveston Buccaneers (1931–1937), the earlier Galveston Sand Crabs (1889–1890, 1892, 1897–99, 1907–1911, 1922–1924), Galveston Pirates (1912–17, 1919–1921) and Galveston Giants (1888).

Home venues

Beach Park
Beach Park was the home venue of the Galveston Pirates from 1912 to 1914. On September 7, 1913, the final day of the baseball season, the San Antonio Bronchos and Galveston Pirates played a game that lasted 49 minutes, the fastest game in Texas League history in order to avoid rain in the area. Galveston won 4–1 over San Antonio.

Pirate Field
Pirate Field was the home of the Galveston Pirates from 1915 to 1920.

Gulfview Park
Gulfview Park existed for five years for the Texas League Galveston baseball clubs and was the home of the Pirates in 1921. From home plate to right field measured 260 feet, and the Blue Goose Saloon was located nearby to right field.

References

Sources
 "Baseball in the Lone Star State: Texas League's Greatest Hits," Tom Kayser and David King, Trinity University Press 2005
 "The Texas League 1888-1987: A Century of Baseball," Bill O'Neal, c.1987

Baseball teams established in 1912
Defunct Texas League teams
Sports in Galveston, Texas
Defunct baseball teams in Texas
1912 establishments in Texas
Baseball teams disestablished in 1921
1921 disestablishments in Texas